Michael Drobot is a convicted felon who pleaded guilty to orchestrating the largest fraud in California history.  Between 1978 and 2013, Drobot managed 28 hospitals along the East Coast, including the Mount Sinai Roosevelt in New York (formerly the Roosevelt Medical Center). He also owned eight hospitals, including Pacific Hospital of Long Beach  (now College Medical Center) and two health maintenance organizations.

Career

Early year in hospital administration
Drobot spent his early years in Detroit, Michigan, before joining the United States Navy during the Vietnam War. During his time in the Navy, Drobot managed the Naval Hospital in Oakland, California. Upon his discharge from the Navy, Drobot pursued a career in hospital management by first obtaining an MBA in hospital administration from George Washington University.

Healthcare administration in California

Drobot's Concept Health Group, Inc. acquired Healthcare Medical Center of Tustin in July 1990. Drobot had been the executive director of Healthcare Medical Center from 1980 to 1984. Under Drobot, Concept Healthcare expanded the hospital’s services deeper into the Irvine area and added new centers for oncology and sports medicine.

In the course of his 35 years career in healthcare, Drobot had the longest association with Pacific Hospital of Long Beach, which he owned and managed from 1997 to 2013, when it was sold to Molina Healthcare and became College Medical Center. Whilst CEO of Pacific Hospital, the hospital was nationally recognized for infection control measures. The hospital’s focus on a germ free environment garnered a Certificate of Special Congressional Recognition in 2009 .  Pacific Hospital of Long Beach received an award from the Southern California Patient Safety First (SCPSF) for reducing sepsis mortality and hospital associated infection rates from 2010-2012.

In 2013, Pacific Hospital of Long Beach was accredited by National Integrated Accreditation of Healthcare Organizations for meeting its standards of patient care and quality management. In 2013, the hospital was also designated as ISO 9001:3008 compliant by DNV Healthcare, an accreditor of US hospitals integrating ISO 9001 quality compliance with the Medicare Conditions of Participation.

Legal issues

During a criminal investigation, in February 2014, Drobot was charged by the FBI in with orchestrating a wide-ranging conspiracy and with paying illegal kickbacks. As part of the indictment, Drobot was charged with bribing Senator Ron Calderon to preserve California’s spinal pass through law. Senator Calderon was separately indicted by the FBI for accepting bribes and kickbacks from Drobot and others. Drobot signed a plea agreement agreeing to cooperate in the government’s ongoing investigation of Senator Calderon and his brother, Tom Calderon, and also into the healthcare fraud scheme known as Operation Spinal Cap.

In October 2014 Drobot, along with his business partners, was sued for using counterfeit screws and hardware in spinal surgeries performed at Pacific Hospital and other area hospitals. At a Feb. 20, 2015 court hearing, Los Angeles Superior Court Judge Elihu M. Berle rejected the claims against the group accused of using counterfeit surgical screws as in 29 out of 32 cases the plaintiffs were never treated at Pacific Hospital.  Drobot filed a $50 million defamation suit in October 2014 against attorneys Brian Kabateck and Robert Hutchinson and the law firms of Kabateck Brown Kellner, Cotchett Pitre & McCarthy and Knox Ricksen. In April 2015, Drobot and his company Healthsmart Pacific, Inc. filed a lawsuit against 30 individuals and their attorneys for falsely and maliciously claiming that Drobot and Healthsmart’s former hospital, Pacific Hospital of Long Beach, harmed them via a non-existent "counterfeit screw" conspiracy. Drobot has agreed to cooperate fully with prosecutors in a case that U.S. attorney’s office spokesman Thom Mrozek has said "remains active and ongoing".

References

Businesspeople from Detroit
George Washington University alumni
Year of birth missing (living people)
Living people